Dino Esposito is an Italian consultant and the author of several .NET books published by Microsoft Press. Based in Italy, Dino is a frequent speaker at industry events worldwide.

In the May 2006 edition of Microsoft's Developer Network (MSDN) Magazine, Dino made his 100th consecutive installment to the column called "Cutting Edge". He has been writing this column since January 1998 in Microsoft Internet Developer (MIND) – which in March 2000 merged with Microsoft Systems Journal (MSJ) to form MSDN Magazine. He is also a frequent contributor to Dr. Dobb's, where he writes primarily about programming with Microsoft Web technologies, especially ASP.NET and ASP.NET MVC. Dino has also written regularly for Simple-Talk for several years on ASP.NET with over sixty articles to his credit.

References

External links 
 MSDN Magazine homepage
 Articles by Dino
 Dino's blog
 Dino's Simple-Talk articles
 Dino's books on Amazon

Living people
1965 births